Boquerón may refer to:
Boquerón, Cuba
Boquerón, Las Piedras, Puerto Rico
Boquerón, Cabo Rojo, Puerto Rico
Boquerón Bay, Puerto Rico
Boquerón, Chiriquí, Panama
Boquerón Department, Paraguay
Boquerón (island), an island in the Archipelago of San Bernardo governed by Colombia
Boquerón River, Honduras
Playa de Boquerón (Boquerón Beach) the beach adjacent to Boquerón Bay
El Boquerón (El Salvador), a volcano
El Boquerón (Honduras), a mountain
El Boquerón Natural Monument, a national monument on the eponymous Honduran mountain
Battle of Boquerón (1932) of the Chaco War
Battle of Boquerón (1866) of the Paraguayan War

See also
Boquerones, a Spanish dish of marinated anchovies